The chief diversity officer (CDO) is an organization’s executive level diversity and inclusion strategist, whose job may include, but is not limited to, addressing discrimination in the workplace, launching initiative to change organizational culture, and increasing the range of backgrounds and the representation of various groups in staff, volunteers, and/or management. Roughly 52% of Fortune 500 companies employ diversity officers.

Historical background 
The chief diversity officer serves in an executive level leadership role. According to Billy E. Vaughn, a history of cultural diversity pioneer work conducted by university professors, cultural diversity consultants, and human resource officers precedes the chief diversity officer. Less than 20 percent of Fortune 500 companies employed diversity officers in 2005, but that number has grown considerably since then. Only recently has there been a discussion about the appropriate background education and credentials the diversity officer needs. In the business sector, the role remains tied to human resource management functions. Higher education chief diversity officers tend to have doctoral degrees.

Credentialing 

Diversity Certification refers to credential training that empowers professionals with the techniques, skills, and tools. The resulting expertise drives their career in consulting, training, and managing diversity. The credential training is still in its infancy. Training prepares individuals to serve in the cultural diversity profession role. A cultural diversity practitioner has expertise in managing and leading programs designed to foster productive relationships among people of different cultures.

Diversity Training University International (DTUI) offered the first cultural diversity professional (CDP) and cultural diversity trainer (CDT) credentialing program in 1998. It was not the first organization to offer a specialization in cultural diversity management expertise. Cornell University offered a certificate specialization about the same year. The National Training Laboratory (NTL) also offered a certificate program. Cornell University now offers a certificate program and the CCDP credentials.

A good credentialing program will offer professionals new to the role the competence needed to succeed. The training takes seasoned professionals to the next performance level by building on existing competencies and providing credentials. A comprehensive, well designed credentialing program is backed by a body of knowledge collected from leaders in the field, evidenced-based techniques and tools, a strategic framework, leadership competency, and training skills.

See also 
 Diversity (business)

References

Citations

Sources 
 Williams, D. & Wade-Golden, K. (2006). What is a Chief Diversity Officer?  Inside Higher Education (original publication). http://www.insidehighered.com/workplace/2006/04/18/williams
 Vaughn, B. (2008). Letters from the Editor. Diversity Officer Magazine. http://diversityofficermagazine.com/
 Martin, M. & Vaughn, B. E. (2007). Cultural Competence: The Nuts & Bolts of Diversity & Inclusion. In Billy E. Vaughn (Ed.), Strategic Diversity & Inclusion Management (Now Diversity Officer magazine), pp. 31–38, Vol. 1, No. 1. Diversity Training University: San Francisco.
 Vaughn, B. E. (2007). The history of diversity training and its pioneers. In Billy E. Vaughn (Ed.), Strategic Diversity & Inclusion Management (Now Diversity Officer magazine), pp. 11–16, Vol. 1, No. 1. Diversity Training University: San Francisco.

Management occupations